|

Koziki  is a village in the administrative district of Gmina Śniadowo, within Łomża County, Podlaskie Voivodeship, in north-eastern Poland.

The village has a population of 240.

References

Koziki